The Palace of the Goyeneche (Spanish: Palacio de los Goyeneche) is a baroque palace located in Illana, Spain. The building is one of a number of palaces in Spain and Peru which are associated with the Goyeneche family.

The palace has not been well preserved, but it was declared Bien de Interés Cultural (a heritage listing) in 1992.

References 

Bien de Interés Cultural landmarks in the Province of Guadalajara
Buildings and structures in the Province of Guadalajara
Palaces in Castilla–La Mancha